Palamel is a village in Alappuzha district in the Indian state of Kerala.It is located 10km south of Pandalam

Demographics
 India census, Palamel had a population of 31916 with 15112 males and 16804 females.

Importance 
Panayil & Muthukattukara Devi temples are the famous and ancient temples in this place. Chempakassery, an ancient nair family is one among the prominent family in this place. Palamel is bordering with Pandalam, Chunakkara, Nooranad and Thamarakkulam panchayaths. Palamel is part of the Onattukara cultural region. Kettu Kazhcha - a procession of two huge oxen is carried out here as part of the Padanilam Parabrahma Temple Sivarathri festival.

The Karingalichal Lake and puncha are situated near Palamel. It is part of Upper Kuttanad and lies in the Drainage basin of Achankovil river.

Famous Persons from Palamel 

 P. Prasad - Cherthala M.L.A.

References

Villages in Alappuzha district